24 Aquilae (abbreviated 24 Aql) is a star in the equatorial constellation of Aquila. 24 Aquilae is its Flamsteed designation. According to the Bortle Dark-Sky Scale, this star is just visible to the naked eye in dark rural skies. It is drifting closer to the Sun with a radial velocity of −26 km/s.

This is a so-called mild barium star, as identified by the presence of a weak absorption line of singly-ionized barium atoms at a wavelength of 455.4 nm. Such stars display an atmospheric overabundance of carbon and the heavy elements produced by the s-process, which was most likely transferred into the atmosphere by a wide binary stellar companion. However, in the case of 24 Aquilae, the abundances of heavy elements are near normal.

At an estimated age of a half billion years, 24 Aquilae is a evolved giant star with a stellar classification of K0 IIIa. It has more than double the mass of the Sun, 11 times the Sun's radius, and shines with 56 times the Sun's luminosity. It is radiating this energy into space from its outer atmosphere at an effective temperature of 4,733 K. This heat is what gives it the cool orange hue characteristic of a K-type star.

References

External links
 HR 7321
 Image 24 Aquilae

K-type giants
Barium stars
Durchmusterung objects
181053
094913
7321
Aquila (constellation)